Sher Shah Suri Mosque, also known as Shershahi Mosque, is an example of the Afghan style of architecture. Sher Shah Suri built this mosque in 1540–1545 to commemorate his reign. It is sited in the south-west corner of Purab Darwaza near Dhawalpura.

History 
It was completed in 1545.

Architecture
Built in Afghan architectural style, it is one of the many historic mosques in India and a landmark in Patna.  There is a tomb inside the complex of the mosque which is covered by an octagonal stone slab. But the star attraction of the Sher Shah Suri Masjid is its central dome which lies in the middle of the roof and is surrounded by Four small domes. The unique part of this design is that if you view from any angle there appears to be only three domes.

References

Mosques in Bihar
Sur Empire
Religious buildings and structures in Patna
Religious buildings and structures completed in 1545